Four Great Points is the third studio album by the Louisville-based math rock band June of 44, released on January 20, 1998, by Quarterstick Records.

Critical reception
The Chicago Reader called the album "a hypnotic blend of rock, dub, ambient, and orchestral pop," writing that "most of the songs begin with a simple but solid hook; dropped into the harmonic pond it blossoms into a series of variations that move farther and farther from the center." Salon deemed the album "a consistently inventive record, and one that carries a level of emotion that's rare in a genre often plagued with detached, highly textured noodling."

Track listing

Personnel
Adapted from the Four Great Points liner notes.

June of 44
 Fred Erskine – bass guitar, trumpet
 Sean Meadows – electric guitar, vocals, bells
 Jeff Mueller – electric guitar, vocals, Moog synthesizer
 Doug Scharin – drums, percussion, Moog synthesizer, sampler

Additional musicians
 Bundy K. Brown – electronics (5)
 Julie Liu – violin (1, 5)
Production and additional personnel
 Geoff Sykes – mastering
 Bob Weston – production, recording, mixing

Release history

References

External links 
 

1998 albums
June of 44 albums
Quarterstick Records albums
Albums produced by Bob Weston